The Wahnapitae First Nation is an Ojibway First Nation band government in the Canadian province of Ontario, who primarily reside on the  Wahnapitae Indian Reserve No. 11  on the northwestern shore of Lake Wanapitei. The First Nation is a signatory to the Robinson-Huron Treaty of 1850 as the Tahgaiwenene's Band. The reserve had a resident population of 102 in the Canada 2011 Census; the First Nation also has approximately 200 further registered members who currently live off-reserve.

The reserve is an enclave located entirely within the city boundaries of Greater Sudbury, although it is not legally or politically part of the city. However, the reserve is considered part of Greater Sudbury's Census Metropolitan Area and its census division, and for postal delivery and telephone exchange purposes the reserve is within the service area of the Greater Sudbury neighbourhood of Capreol.

The main business on the reserve is Rocky's, a bar and restaurant with camping facilities and snowmobiling trails which is popular with recreational and permanent residents of the Lake Wanapitei area.

The reserve also should not be confused with the neighbourhood of Wahnapitae within the city of Greater Sudbury.

Governance
The First Nation is a member of the Waabnoong Bemjiwang Association of First Nations, a regional tribal council. Council consists of an elected five positions. Nominations for position of chief and four positions of council are held.

References

External links
 profile from INAC

First Nations governments in Ontario
Ojibwe governments
Algonquian ethnonyms